Zoltán Jeney (4 March 1943 – 28 October 2019) was a Hungarian composer.

Jeney was born in Szolnok Hungary. He first studied piano and attended Pongrácz's composition classes at the Debrecen Secondary Music School, later continuing composition studies with Ferenc Farkas at the Liszt Ferenc Academy of Music in Budapest (1961–66), and pursuing postgraduate studies with Goffredo Petrassi at the Accademia Nazionale di Santa Cecilia in Rome (1967–68).

Jeney's earliest compositions exhibit the influences of Béla Bartók, Luigi Dallapiccola, Anton Webern, Alban Berg, the new Polish school, György Kurtág, and Zsolt Durkó. In the late 1960s, he began to take an interest in Pierre Boulez's theories, Karlheinz Stockhausen's compositions, and oriental philosophy—a direction intensified as a result of his contact with John Cage's philosophy. In the 1970s Jeney began composing music in the minimal style, and his works are often characterized by an extremely spare and static quality.

From 1986 on Jeney was a professor at the Liszt Ferenc Academy of Music in Budapest, Hungary where, since 1995, he served as Head of the Department of Composition. Several of his compositions have been released on the Hungaroton label.

Notes

References
Discography at Classics Online.

External links
Zoltán Jeney page at Budapest Music Center page
Online biography of Jeney at website of the Bozzini Quartet.

1943 births
2019 deaths
20th-century classical composers
21st-century classical composers
Accademia Nazionale di Santa Cecilia alumni
Franz Liszt Academy of Music alumni
Hungarian classical composers
Hungarian male classical composers
People from Szolnok